Svetlana Anatolievna  Rozhkova (16 February 1965, Mozhaisk) is a Russian humorist, an actress of a conversational genre. Honored Artist of Russia (30 August 1996).

She was born on 16 February 1965 in Mozhaisk, into the family of Elena Mikhailovna Rozhkova  and Anatoly Ivanovich Rozhkov.

She studied at Russian State Institute of Performing Arts. Graduated GITIS in 1986.

Since the late 1990s, she has been a regular participant in humorous programs and concerts, including appearances on the show of Yevgeny Petrosyan and Regina Dubovitskaya.

Personal life 

 First husband —  Andrei Bogdanov, musician and drummer, now lives abroad. 
 Oldest daughter —  Yana, a linguist, knows English, Norwegian, Italian and Spanish. 
 Second husband —  Yuri Yevdokunin (born March 5, 1967)  a singer and director. We met in Kislovodsk, when she worked as an entertainer.
 Younger daughter —  Varvara, student Sholokhov Moscow State University for Humanities (vocal art) workshop of Sergey Penkin.

References

External links
Профиль Светланы Рожковой на Last.fm
 Видеоролики на youtube

1965 births
Living people
People from Mozhaysk
Soviet actresses
Russian actresses
Russian Academy of Theatre Arts alumni
Honored Artists of the Russian Federation
Russian women comedians